Långås is a locality situated in Falkenberg Municipality, Halland County, Sweden, with 534 inhabitants in 2010. The footballer Patric Andersson is from the village.

References 

Populated places in Falkenberg Municipality